Augusta USD 402 is a public unified school district headquartered in Augusta, Kansas, United States.  The district includes the communities of Augusta, Gordon, and nearby rural areas.

Schools
The school district operates the following schools:
 Augusta High School
 Augusta Middle School
 Ewalt Elementary School
 Garfield Elementary School
 Lincoln Elementary School
 Robinson Elementary School

See also
 Kansas State Department of Education
 Kansas State High School Activities Association
 List of high schools in Kansas
 List of unified school districts in Kansas

References

External links
 

School districts in Kansas